The 1958 Women's Western Open was contested from June 19–22 at Kahkwa Country Club located in Erie, Pennsylvania. It was the 29th edition of the Women's Western Open.

This event was won by Patty Berg.

Final leaderboard

External links
Pittsburgh Post-Gazette source

Women's Western Open
Golf in Pennsylvania
Women's Western Open
Women's Western Open
Women's Western Open
Women's Western Open
Women's sports in Pennsylvania